Funeral potatoes (also great potatoes, cheesy potatoes, hash brown casserole, cheesy hash browns, those potatoes,  or party potatoes) is a traditional potato hotdish or casserole that is popular in the American Intermountain West and Midwest. It is called "funeral" potatoes because it is commonly served as a side dish during traditional after-funeral dinners,  but it is also served at potlucks, and other social gatherings, sometimes with different names.  The dish has sometimes been associated with members of The Church of Jesus Christ of Latter-day Saints, because of its popularity among members of the Church.

Ingredients and preparation
The dish usually consists of hash browns or cubed potatoes, cheese (cheddar or Parmesan), onions, cream soup (chicken, mushroom, or celery) or a cream sauce, sour cream, and a topping of butter with corn flakes or crushed potato chips. Ingredients in some variations include cubed baked ham, frozen peas, or broccoli florets.

In popular culture
During the 2002 Winter Olympics in Salt Lake City, one of the souvenir "food pins" featured a depiction of funeral potatoes.

See also

 Culture of The Church of Jesus Christ of Latter-day Saints
 List of casserole dishes
 List of potato dishes

References

External links

Potato dishes
Latter Day Saint culture
Relief Society
Utah cuisine
Funeral food and drink
Mormonism and death
American casseroles